Thomas Maher may refer to:
 Tom Maher (baseball) (1870–1929), American baseball player
 T. J. Maher (1922–2002), Irish politician
 Tom Maher (born 1952), Australian basketball coach

See also 
 Tom Mahir (1915–1970), British police officer
 Maher (disambiguation)